Newcastle KB United was an Australian professional association football club based in Newcastle, New South Wales. The club was formed in 1977 and joined the National Soccer League in the 1978 season.

Newcastle KB United's first team has competed in the National Soccer League and their record against each club faced in the National Soccer League is listed below. Newcastle KB United's first National Soccer League match was against Eastern Suburbs and they met their 20th and last different opponent, Brunswick Juventus, for the first time in the 1984 National Soccer League season. The teams that Newcastle KB United played the most in league competition was Marconi Fairfield and Sydney City, who they first met in the 1978 National Soccer League season; the 11 defeats from 13 meetings against Sydney City was more than they have lost against any other club. Adelaide City drew 7 league encounters with Newcastle KB United, more than any other club. Newcastle KB United had recorded more league victories against Canberra City than against any other club, having beaten them 7 times out of 12 attempts.

Key
 The table includes results of matches played by Newcastle KB United in the National Soccer League.
 The name used for each opponent is the name they had when Newcastle KB United most recently played a league match against them.
 The columns headed "First" and "Last" contain the first and last seasons in which Newcastle KB United played league matches against each opponent.
 P = matches played; W = matches won; D = matches drawn; L = matches lost; Win% = percentage of total matches won
   Clubs with this background and symbol in the "Opponent" column were defunct during the club's period.

All-time league record

Footnotes

References
General
 

Specific

League record by opponent
Newcastle KB United